Bougainville
 Atoll

See also